Vassar is an unincorporated community in Latah County, in the U.S. state of Idaho.

History
The community was probably named for James R. Vassar, an early settler.

References

Unincorporated communities in Latah County, Idaho
Unincorporated communities in Idaho